Green Eyed Soul is the debut album by German recording artist Sarah Connor. It was released by X-Cell Records and Epic Records on November 26, 2001, in German-speaking Europe. Connor worked on the majority of the album with Bülent Aris and duo Rob Tyger and Kay Denar, all of who would become frequent collaborators on subsequent projects. She also collaborated with American rapper TQ as well as producers Adam Charon, Mekong Age, and Rufi-Oh. Green Eyed Soul is predominantly a pop album with major influences of contemporary R&B, hip hop and soul music. The album's lyrics explore the complexities of romantic relationships and stages of love.

Green Eyed Soul received a generally mixed reception from professional music critics, who declared it a mixed bag but considered it a solid career launcher. Upon its release, it opened at number two on the German Albums Chart, and within the top five in Austria, Finland and Switzerland. Ranking among Connor's biggest-selling international efforts, the album eventually reached gold status in Austria, Czech, Poland, Portugal and Switzerland and was certified platinum by the Musiikkituottajat (IFPI Finland) and triple gold by the Bundesverband Musikindustrie (BVMI). In 2002, it ranked number twenty-eighth on the German Albums year-end chart.

Altogether Green Eyed Soul spawned three singles, including "Let's Get Back to Bed – Boy!" featuring TQ, "French Kissing" (based on a sample of Blackstreet's "No Diggity"), and the ballad "From Sarah with Love", Connor's first number-one hit and breakthrough song. A fourth track, "If U Were My Man", received a limited promotional release in Eastern Europe, but failed to chart anywhere. In support of the album, Connor embarked on the Green Eyed Soul Tour in 2002.

Track listing

Notes and sample credits
 denotes co-producer
 denotes additional producer
 "French Kissing" contains a sample from "No Diggity", originally recorded by Blackstreet.
 "In My House" is a cover version of Rick James's same-titled 1984 song.

Charts

Weekly charts

Year-end charts

Certifications

References

External links
 SarahConnor.com — official site

2001 debut albums
Sarah Connor (singer) albums